Châlons-en-Champagne is a city in the Grand Est region of France. It is the capital of the department of Marne, despite being only a quarter the size of the city of Reims.

Formerly called Châlons-sur-Marne, the city was officially renamed in 1998. It should not be confused with the Burgundian town of Chalon-sur-Saône.

History

Châlons is conjectured to be the site of several battles including the Battle of Châlons fought in 274 between Roman Emperor Aurelian and Emperor Tetricus I of the Gallic Empire. The Catalaunian Fields was the site of the battle of Châlons in 451 which turned back the westward advance of Attila.

It is the setting of the last operetta of Johann Strauss II, Die Göttin der Vernunft (The Goddess of Reason), (1897) and is mentioned in, “It’s the Great Pumpkin, Charlie Brown,” as Snoopy’s crash site after doing battle with the Red Baron.

Population

Main sights

 Saint Etienne's cathedral, including parts of the first Romanesque cathedral built in the 12th century. Nevertheless, it was mainly rebuilt in Gothic style. The west façade (in Baroque style) and two close spans were added in the 17th century.
 Notre-Dame-en-Vaux church, part of the UNESCO World Heritage. Built between 1157 and 1217, the collegiate church had a cloister and was a place of pilgrimage in the 12th century, and Museum du Cloitre de Notre-Dame-en-Vaux 12th century.
 Saint-Alpin, perhaps the oldest church of the city. It was rebuilt around 1170 in Gothic style, but still marked by the Romanesque style.
 Hôtel de Ville (city hall). It has a façade representative of the neo-classic period of the end of the 18th century. The steps of the building are protected by four stone lions.
 Porte Sainte-Croix (Sainte-Croix Gate). Previously called Porte Dauphine, this gate was one of the entries into the city. It was dedicated to Marie-Antoinette when she came via Châlons on her way to Paris to marry the future king Louis XVI of France.
 La Dernière Relève ("The Last Relief"): war memorial next to the cathedral, with group of bronzes by French sculptor Gaston Broquet.
 Ancien Hotel des Intendants de Champagne (eighteenth century). Today home to the Prefecture of the Champagne-Ardenne region and Prefecture of the Marne.
 Le Cirque. The old town circus, completed in 1899, is sheltering the Centre National des Arts du Cirque (CNAC).

Transport

The Gare de Châlons-en-Champagne railway station is served by the TGV network with service to and from Paris Gare de l'Est. Other destinations are Reims, Saint-Dizier, Nancy, Bar-le-Duc and Verdun. Additionally, Châlons is connected with the Champagne-TGV station, near Reims, with high speed trains going to Lille, Nantes, Rennes and Paris-Charles de Gaulle Airport.

Châlons is located at the intersection of two major axes:
 A4 motorway, going from Paris to Strasbourg, towards Reims and Metz
 A26 motorway, going from Lille to Lyon, towards Reims, Troyes and Dijon.

Châlons is also served by an international airport devoted to shipping (Châlons Vatry Airport ), ranking third in France with almost 60,000 tonnes of freight passing through each year.

Local transportation is provided by SITAC BUS buses.

Education

University level

 Arts et Métiers ParisTech (ENSAM), a national engineering graduate school. This teaching and research center was established in 1806. Students can attend courses focused on mechanical and industrial engineering.
 Centre national des arts du cirque (CNAC), which is a Circus Arts Learning Centre created in 1985. Each year about twenty students learn all the disciplines of modern circus arts.
 Institut Universitaire Technologique (IUT) of Reims, Châlons, Charleville, a branch of the University of Reims Champagne-Ardenne (URCA)
 Institut Universitaire de Formation des Maîtres (IUFM), a branch of the University of Reims Champagne-Ardenne (URCA)

Sport
ESPE Basket Châlons-en-Champagne is a Châlons' basketball team. A temporary firing range was used for some shooting events at the 1924 Summer Olympics in Paris.

Twin towns – sister cities

Châlons-en-Champagne is twinned with:

 Bobo-Dioulasso, Burkina Faso
 Ilkeston, England, United Kingdom
 Mirabel, Canada
 Neuss, Germany
 Razgrad, Bulgaria
 Wittenberge, Germany

Camp de Mourmelon
It was created at the behest of Napoleon III and opened 30 August 1857 during the Second French Empire.

The initial purpose was simply for practising military manoeuvres, but it quickly turned into a showcase of the French Imperial Army, a theatrical propaganda display, where French citizens could meet the army and watch parades. Each year the camp was transformed into a town of tents and wooden chalets.

The camp survived the fall of the Second Empire in 1870, but changed into a training camp and a departure point for troops engaging in overseas operations.

The camp is used for military manoeuvres, and cavalry training, along with the neighbouring, 2,500 hectare, Camp de Moronvillers. Firing of live ordnance (rockets, missiles) is prohibited.

Births 

Châlons-en-Champagne was the birthplace of:
 Martin Akakia (1500–1551)
 Thierry Beschefer (1630–1711), Jesuit missionary
 David Blondel (1591–1655), Protestant clergyman
 Claude D'Espence (1511–1571) French theologian
 Jean Talon (1626–1694), first Intendant of New France
 Antoine de Chézy (1718–1798), hydraulics engineer
 Nicolas Appert (1749–1841), inventor of "appertisation" for the preservation of food
 Jean-Baptiste Charbonnier (1764–1859), composer and organist
 Joseph-François Mangin (1764–1818), designer of the St. Patrick's Old Cathedral and the New York City Hall
 Henri Dagonet (1823–1902), psychiatrist
 Adolphe Willette (1857–1926), painter
 Maurice Renard (1875–1939), writer
 Etienne Oehmichen (1884–1955), engineer, considered father of the helicopter
 Robert Louis Antral (1895–1939) painter
 Cabu (1938–2015), comic strip artist and caricaturist
 Maryvonne de Saint-Pulgent (born 1951), senior civil servant and musicologist
 Mano Solo (1963–2010), singer
 Xavier Bertrand (born 1965), politician
 Jacques Massu (1908–2002), paratrooper, general
 Ocquidant, Jennifer (born 1981), environmental activist

Deaths

Châlons-en-Champagne was the death place of:
 Jean-Baptiste Charbonnier (1764–1859), composer and organist
 George Canning, 1st Baron Garvagh (1778–1840), diplomat and Fellow of the Royal Society of London, nephew to British Prime Minister George Canning (1770–1827)
 Clyde Fitch, American dramatist

Image

See also
Diocese of Châlons
French wine
Champagne Riots
The works of Antonin Mercié

References

Further reading
 Mark W. Konnert, Civic Agendas and Religious Passion: Châlons-sur-Marne during the French wars of religion, 1560–1594 (Kirksville, MO, Sixteenth Century Journal Publishers, 1997) (Sixteenth Century Essays & Studies, 35). 
 Jean-Paul Barbier and Michel Bursaux, The Bonapartes in Châlons en Champagne (Les Bonaparte à Châlons en Champagne), Marnaise Studies (Etudes Marnaises), SACSAM, 2009.

External links

 Official website (English/French/German)
 History and photographs of Camp Chalons
 

 
Communes of Marne (department)
World Heritage Sites in France
Prefectures in France
Catalauni
Champagne (province)
Aude communes articles needing translation from French Wikipedia